This is a list of Emergency Medical Services providers in the Canadian province of Ontario.

In 1999 The Government of Ontario downloaded responsibility for the provision of Land Ambulance Services. In the southern half of the province, the responsibility fell onto Upper Tier Municipalities, such as county or regional governments as well as some larger cities and townships. In the north, it became the responsibility (for the most part) of District Social Service Boards. In both cases, UTMs/DSSBs may choose to operate the service directly, or, contract provision of service out to a third party provider, be it neighbouring service or private operator.

Land Ambulance Service Providers in Southern Ontario

South Western Ontario
Essex-Windsor EMS
Lambton EMS
Chatham-Kent EMS
Middlesex-London EMS
Huron County Paramedic Services
Oxford County Paramedic Services
Perth County Paramedic Services
Bruce County Paramedic Service
Grey County Paramedic Services
Elgin-St. Thomas EMS
Region of Waterloo Paramedic Services
Dufferin County Paramedic Services
Guelph-Wellington Paramedic Service

Central Ontario/Golden Horseshoe
Hamilton Paramedic Service
Norfolk County Paramedic Services
Brant-Brantford Paramedic Services
Haldimand County Paramedic Services
Niagara Region EMS
Peel Regional Paramedic Services
Halton Region Paramedic Services
Toronto Paramedic Services
Region of Durham Paramedic Services
York Region Paramedic Services
County of Simcoe Paramedic Services
Kawartha Lakes Paramedic Service
Peterborough County-City Paramedics
Northumberland Paramedics
Haliburton County Paramedic Service

Eastern Ontario
Hastings-Quinte Paramedic Services
Lanark County Paramedic Service
Leeds Grenville Paramedic Service
Lennox & Addington Ambulance Service
Frontenac Paramedic Services
County of Renfrew Paramedic Service
Ottawa Paramedic Service
Cornwall SD&G Paramedic Services
Prescott-Russell Paramedic Service

Land Ambulance Service Providers in Northern Ontario

Central/North
Muskoka Paramedic Services
Parry Sound District EMS
Nipissing Paramedic Services

Sudbury/Algoma
Greater Sudbury Paramedic Services
Manitoulin-Sudbury DSB Paramedic Services
Algoma District Paramedic Services
District of Sault Ste. Marie Paramedic Services

Timiskaming/Cochrane
Timiskaming EMS
Cochrane District EMS

Thunder Bay/Kenora/Rainy River
Northwest EMS
Rainy River District EMS
Superior North EMS

First Nations Ambulance Services

Operators that provide service to first nations communities are directly funded by the provincial government.
Akwesasne Mohawk Ambulance
Beausoleil First Nation EMS
Weeneebayko Area Health Authority Paramedic Services
Naotkamegwanning EMS
Oneida Paramedic Services
Rama Paramedic Services
Six Nations Ambulance Service

Air Ambulance Providers

Ornge (formerly Ontario Air Ambulance) is the statutory provider of air ambulance services in the province of Ontario. Ornge provides rotary and fixed wing coverage across the province. Where assets are unavailable or when additional capacity is required, Orgne has contracted with a number of providers to provide supplemental fixed wing coverage. These flights operate almost exclusively in the northern part of the province in order to facilitate access to specialized facilities available in more urban areas in the south. Services under contract include:

Air Bravo
Sky Care
Thunder Air

Several other companies in the province offer air medical services as well, generally as repatriation flights for private insurance companies, however these services are not covered by OHIP.

See also
Paramedics in Canada 
Emergency medical services in Canada

References

Upper-Tier Municipalities Contacts (CAO / EMS)
UTM/DDA Status
First Nations Ambulance Service Providers

 
Medical and health organizations based in Ontario
Ontario-related lists